Altishane or Altishahane is a small settlement and townland in County Tyrone, Northern Ireland. It lies near Strabane, between Plumbridge and Donemana. It is situated in the historic barony of Strabane Lower and the civil parish of Donaghedy and covers an area of 744 acres. There is one primary school, Altishane Primary School.

The population of the townland increased slightly overall during the 19th century:

Sport
Altishane's local Gaelic Athletic Association football team is called Clann Na nGael.

See also
List of townlands of County Tyrone

References

Villages in County Tyrone
Townlands of County Tyrone
Barony of Strabane Lower